Matthew Dennis (born 15 April 2002)  is an English professional footballer who plays as a forward for EFL League Two club Sutton United, on loan from Milton Keynes Dons.

Club career

Arsenal
Dennis joined the academy of Premier League club Arsenal at the age of six, and went on to progress through various age groups. He later featured regularly for the club's U18 and U23 sides.

Norwich City
On 28 July 2020, Dennis signed for EFL Championship club Norwich City following the expiry of his contract with Arsenal. In his first season he featured for the club's U23 side in the EFL Trophy, scoring twice in four games. On 13 August 2021, Dennis was sent out on loan to National League club Southend United for the duration of the 2021–22. He went on to make 29 appearances and score 8 goals for the club before returning to Norwich City.

Milton Keynes Dons
On 4 June 2022, Dennis signed for EFL League One club Milton Keynes Dons for an undisclosed fee. He made his debut on 30 July 2022 as an 82nd-minute substitute in a 1–0 defeat away to Cambridge United. Dennis scored his first goal for the club on 23 August 2022, in a 2–0 EFL Cup second round away win over Watford. In January 2023 he joined EFL League Two team Sutton United on loan.

Career statistics

References

2002 births
Living people
Association football forwards
English footballers
Arsenal F.C. players
Norwich City F.C. players
Milton Keynes Dons F.C. players
English Football League players